Julie Mitchum (born Annette Mitchum, July 23, 1914 – February 21, 2003) was an American actress.

Biography 
Mitchum was born  in Charleston, South Carolina, to James Thomas Mitchum and Ann Harriet Gunderson. Unlike her younger brothers Robert and John, who were employed full time in the film industry, Julie Mitchum acted in only a handful of productions between 1947 and 1959. 

Perhaps Mitchum's most notable role was her final film appearance as that of Ruth Bridgers in the 1959 William Castle "campy supernatural horror" film House on Haunted Hill, in which she co-starred with Vincent Price. She also had an uncredited bit part as a slave in The Ten Commandments as well as The High and the Mighty with John Wayne.

Mitchum was also a musician, singing and playing piano in night clubs. During World War II, she entertained military personnel overseas. In the early 1950s, she had her own program on KLAC-TV in Los Angeles.

In 2003, at age 88, Mitchum died of Alzheimer's disease in Sun City, Arizona.

Filmography

References

External links
 

American film actresses
1914 births
2003 deaths
Actresses from Connecticut
Actresses from South Carolina
Deaths from Alzheimer's disease
Neurological disease deaths in Arizona
American people of English descent
American people of Irish descent
American people of Norwegian descent
American people of Scotch-Irish descent
American people of Scottish descent
Mitchum family
20th-century American actresses
20th-century American women singers
American television personalities
American women television personalities
20th-century American singers
21st-century American women